Kajanus is a surname. Notable people with the surname include:

Georg Kajanus (born 1946), Norwegian composer and pop musician
Robert Kajanus (1856–1933), Finnish conductor, composer, and teacher

Surnames of Scandinavian origin